After the Rain is a Christmas benefit concert television special by Filipina recording artist Regine Velasquez. It originally aired on December 13, 2009, in the Philippines on GMA Network. The charity event was organized by the GMA Kapuso Foundation to raise money, relief, and awareness in response to the loss of life and human suffering that resulted from Typhoon Ketsana (Ondoy). It was directed by Louie Ignacio and executive-produced by Wilma V. Galvante and Joseph Paolo Luciano. The special was performed to a live audience of more than 800 typhoon victims, who were also among the aid recipients.

The program was interspersed with various interviews that showcased stories of grief, heroism, and overcoming adversities following the natural disaster. These were accompanied by tribute numbers, which included popular holiday standards. After the Rain  featured performances by guest musicians, including Pops Fernandez, Kuh Ledesma, Jaya, Kyla, Jay R, and La Diva. Various celebrities also appeared and made commentaries in the special.

Background
In September 2009, Typhoon Ketsana (Ondoy) became the most devastating tropical cyclone to hit Manila. During the 2009 Pacific typhoon season, a state of calamity was declared by then-President Gloria Macapagal Arroyo, encompassing most of Luzon. Ondoy caused widespread flash flooding and power interruptions in the cities and nearby provinces. It resulted in 464 fatalities and caused infrastructure and agriculture damage estimated at billion. Approximately 70,124 people were displaced and sheltered in 244 evacuation centers.

Initial plans for a Christmas benefit concert television special were announced by GMA Network on November 10, 2009, two months in the aftermath of Ondoy. Entitled After the Rain, the two-hour musical documentary featured Regine Velasquez and was described as an "homage to the Filipino spirit that has remained resilient despite the seemingly unending odds". It featured performances to a live audience of more than 800 typhoon victims, and is spliced with a series of interviews that showcased grief, heroism, and overcoming adversities after the typhoon struck. The singer collaborated with various musicians and special guests for the special, which aired on December 13, 2009. During a press conference for the program, Velasquez commented.

GMA and its social programs and outreach division, the GMA Kapuso Foundation, organized the production. Joseph Paolo Luciano served as executive producer, while Louie Ignacio directed it. Darling de Jesus was the supervising producer, with Paul Chia and MeAnn Regala as associate producers. Juel Balbon was in charge of floor production and Grace Toralde as head editor. Bang Arespacochaga was the program manager and Wilma V. Galvante was in charge of the executive production. Raul Mitra was chosen as the musical director. Guest performers included Pops Fernandez, Kuh Ledesma, Jaya, Kyla, Jay R, and La Diva. Various actors and other celebrities made commentaries, such as Dingdong Dantes, Richard Gutierrez, Marian Rivera, Mel Tiangco, and Mike Enriquez.

Synopsis

The special featured three stories documented through a series of video presentations and interviews. The first, showcased a couple who carried on with their wedding plans amidst heavy rainfall and significant flooding. In the second feature, a father who lost his wife and kids as a result of drowning. The final story centers around an orphanage, House of Refuge, hard hit by flooding due levee breach and the rescue of its residents.

Velasquez performed eleven production numbers, which included a collection of classic Christmas songs. She opened the program with a medley of "O Come, O Come, Emmanuel" and "Silent Night" backed by the University of the Philippines Concert Chorus. For the featured stories, these were spliced with accompanying musical numbers where Velasquez was joined by musical guest performers: Mariah Carey's "All I Want for Christmas Is You", which was mashed with the Wonder Girls's "Nobody", the show tune "Home" from the 1974 Broadway musical The Wiz, and Twila Paris's "The Warrior Is a Child". She also sang the Filipino holiday standards "Tuloy Na Tuloy Pa Rin Ang Pasko" and "Kumukutikutitap". "Natutulog Ba Ang Diyos?" was performed with Eva Castillo and Kyla, while Tyler Collins's "Thanks to You" was a duet number with Jay R. Velasquez and La Diva did a rendition of Barry Manilow's "I Made It Through the Rain". The show closed with a performance of the gospel song "Light of a Million Mornings".

Set list
Set list adapted from the special itself.

 "O Come, O Come, Emmanuel" / "Silent Night"
 "All I Want for Christmas Is You" / "Nobody"
 "Home"
 "The Warrior Is a Child"
 "Tuloy Na Tuloy Pa Rin Ang Pasko"
 "Kumukutikutitap"
 "Natutulog Ba Ang Diyos?"
 "Thanks to You"
 "I Made It Through the Rain"
 "Light of a Million Mornings"

Personnel
Credits adapted from the special itself.

Band members

Regine Velasquezlead vocals
Raul Mitramusic director
Wilson Matiaskeyboards
Michael Albabass guitar
Cesar Aguasguitar
Romeo Pacanaguitar
Dix Lucerodrums
Miriam Marquezbackground vocalist
Anthony Cailaobackground vocalist
Mary Rose Borlazabackground vocalist
University of the Philippines Concert Chorus

Production

Wilma V. Galvanteexecutive in charge of production
Joseph Paolo Lucianoexecutive producer
Darling de Jesussupervising producer
MeAnn Regala associate producer
Paul Chiaassociate producer
Bang Arespacochagaprogram manager
Juel Balbonfloor producer
Rannel Davidline producer
Louie Ignaciotelevision director
Grace Toraldeeditor

Guest appearances

Ogie Alcasid
Eva Castillo
Dingdong Dantes
Kris Angelica Dela Cruz
Mike Enriquez
Frencheska Farr
Pops Fernandez
Mae Flores
Richard Gutierrez
Jay R
Jaya
Kiddiewockees
Kyla
La Diva
Maureen Larrazabal
Kuh Ledesma
Moymoy Palaboy
Yassi Pressman
Rufa Mae Quinto
Marian Rivera
Julie Anne San Jose
Jude Matthew Sevilla
Mel Tiangco
Michael V.
Shane Velasco

See also
 List of GMA Network specials aired
 Regine Velasquez on screen and stage

References

Regine Velasquez
2009 television specials
GMA Network television specials